Josef Calanza Max (16 January 1804, Janov – 18 June 1855, Prague) was a German-Czech sculptor. His brother was the sculptor Emanuel Max.

Life 
Max came from a family of sculptors and woodcarvers and received his first lessons from his father. In 1822, encouraged by letters from one of his father's former students, he moved to Prague, where he found employment in a woodcarving workshop. From 1823 to 1824, he studied at the Academy of Fine Arts under Joseph Bergler. He continued working for the woodcarving shop and married the owner's daughter, Anna Maria Schuhmann, in 1834. They had seven children, including the painter Gabriel Max and the photographer/painter Jindřich Břetislav Max (1847–1900). He began to exhibit as early as 1826, but received little recognition except for an award from the Academy for his statue of Germanicus.

In 1830, he opened his own studios. His first major contract was for a series of tombstones in Chrastava, which was obtained through the influence of a friend from the Academy, Joseph von Führich. Another important client was Prince Rudolf Kinský and his wife Vilhelmína. During the 1840s and 50s, he joined with his brother Emanuel to create several important monuments. He often collaborated with the architect Josef Kranner, most notably executing the figures on the monumental fountain dedicated to Francis I, from designs by Kranner.

He died of cholera at the age of 51.

Selected works 

 Tomb for Joseph Bergler, depicting the resurrection of Lazarus, in the Malostranský Cemetery, Prague
 Figures for the tomb of Prince Rudolf Kinsky in Zlonice
 Tomb of Joseph Max, senior, at the cemetery in Sloup v Čechách
 Monuments to Charles IV, Holy Roman Emperor, in Mělník and Karlovy Vary
 Monument to Přemysl the Ploughman in Královské pole, donated by the Nostitz family
 Six sculptures of Czech rulers for the new wing of the Old Town Hall. The figures of Ferdinand I and Francis I were seriously damaged during World War II and are in the Municipal Museum. The other four (Spytihněv I, Ottakar II, Charles IV and Ferdinand III) were transferred to the new building of the Research Institute for Rheumatic Diseases in the 1980s.
 Parts of the Radetzky Monument in Prague (together with his brother Emanuel).
 Sculptures on the Charles Bridge. (Statues of Saints Norbert, Wenceslaus and Sigismund; John the Baptist; Saint Joseph with Jesus)
 Kranner's Fountain

References

Further reading 
 Naděžda Blažíčková-Horová, Josef Max, in: Nová encyklopedie českého výtvarného umění, Vol.I ( A-M). Prague, Academia (1995), pg.497.
 Adam Hnojil, "Pomníková tvorba sochaře Josefa Maxe", in: Umění LIII, 2005, #4, pgs.347 - 365.
 Adam Hnojil, Josef Max, Eminent, Prague (2008) 
  (This article is headed "Anton Max", but actually contains more information on Josef.)

External links 

 List of works on Josef Max in the Czech National Library. 
 Zastavení s bratry Maxovými – Documentary from Czech Television on the Max brothers and the Charles Bridge, hosted by Prof. František Dvořák.

1804 births
1855 deaths
Czech sculptors
Czech male sculptors
19th-century sculptors
German sculptors
German Bohemian people
People from Nový Bor
Burials at Olšany Cemetery